John Edward Daniel (1902–1962) was a Welsh theologian and college lecturer who became chairman of the Welsh political party Plaid Cymru.

Life
Daniel was born in Bangor, Gwynedd, on 26 June 1902 and was educated at the Friars School, Bangor.  He then won a scholarship to the University of Oxford, matriculating as a member of Jesus College, Oxford, in 1919. He obtained a first-class degree in literae humaniores in 1923 and a further first-class degree in divinity in 1925. He was then appointed to a fellowship at the Bala-Bangor Theological College, and became a professor on 28 July 1926, following the death of Thomas Rees. He taught Christian doctrine and the philosophy of religion and was regarded as one of the most able theologians of his generation. However, his publications were few:  (1933) and some journal articles. Although he was never ordained, he was an able preacher.

He was a prominent Welsh nationalist and member of Plaid Cymru. He contributed to its newspaper and stood unsuccessfully as a candidate in three general elections and a by-election in 1945.  He was vice-chairman from 1931 to 1935, and succeeded Saunders Lewis as chairman in 1939 (holding the position until August 1943). In 1946, Daniel was appointed as an inspector of schools, with special responsibility for classics and religious education.  He died as the result of a road accident near Halkyn, Flintshire, on 11 February 1962.

References

1902 births
1962 deaths
People from Bangor, Gwynedd
People educated at Friars School, Bangor
Welsh theologians
Leaders of Plaid Cymru
Alumni of Jesus College, Oxford
20th-century Welsh theologians
20th-century Welsh writers